Cameroon with Egbert is a book by Irish author Dervla Murphy. It was first published by John Murray in 1990.

References

External links
 

1990 non-fiction books
John Murray (publishing house) books
Books by Dervla Murphy